Yinling Hu is a Chinese molecular biologist specialized in cancer immunometabolism, inflammation, and tumorigenesis. She is a senior investigator in the National Cancer Institute. She was an assistant professor at University of Texas MD Anderson Cancer Center.

Education 
Hu completed an undergraduate degree from the Peking Union Medical College and received her Ph.D. from the University of Melbourne. Her 1994 dissertation was titled The regulatory elements responsible for expression of the homeobox gene Cdx-1. She was a postdoctoral fellow in Michael Karin's laboratory, University of California, San Diego from 1996 to 2001.

Career and research 
Hu established her own laboratory in 2001 when she became an assistant professor at the Science Park Research Division, University of Texas MD Anderson Cancer Center. In 2008, she became a principal investigator in the National Cancer Institute's Cancer and Inflammation Program and was awarded tenure in 2016.

Hu's research focuses on understanding the physiological activities of IKKα in skin tumorigenesis and inflammation and in revealing the mechanisms by which IKKα regulates these functions by using genetic animal models, including Ikkα conditional knockout, Ikkα kinase inactive knockin and IKKα transgenic mice, as well as molecular biology approaches.

References 

Peking Union Medical College alumni
Living people
Year of birth missing (living people)
Place of birth missing (living people)
University of Melbourne alumni
People's Republic of China emigrants to the United States
National Institutes of Health people
Chinese molecular biologists
Chinese women biologists
21st-century Chinese scientists
21st-century biologists
21st-century women scientists
University of Texas MD Anderson Cancer Center faculty